Livingly Media (formerly Zimbio, Inc.) is an American digital media company based in Redwood City, California that publishes six lifestyle sites for women: Livingly.com, Lonny.com, Mabelandmoxie.com, Itsrosy.com, Zimbio.com, and StyleBistro.com. The six sites publish original articles, high resolution photography, social videos, and games, reaching a combined audience of over 25 million global monthly readers, according to Quantcast. Livingly covers women's lifestyle, Lonny covers home design, Mabel + Moxie covers parenting, It's Rosy covers women 50+, Zimbio covers entertainment news, and StyleBistro covers celebrity fashion and beauty.

The company was founded as Zimbio, Inc. in 2006 by Tony Mamone and Danny Khatib and venture-backed by Menlo Ventures, Great Oaks Capital, and Draper Richards. The name was changed to Livingly Media in August 2012, shortly after acquiring Lonny magazine. The management team consists of CEO Erica Carter, COO Christophe Decker, Chief Content Office Jill Slattery, Chief Product Officer Erik Kokkonen, and Chief Technology Officer Bruce Martin. In 2015, Livingly Media was acquired by the European digital publishing company Aufeminin.com, then a subsidiary of Axel Springer. In 2018, Aufeminin was acquired by TF1 (Télévision Française 1 S.A). Aufeminin is publicly traded by Euronext Paris in compartment B. (MNEMO : FEM).

History
In May 2006, the company launched its first website, Zimbio.com which focused on entertainment news including movies, music, TV and celebrities.

In July 2010, the company launched StyleBistro.com to focus on fashion and beauty – including what celebrities are wearing, trends and products.

In 2012, the company purchased Lonny Magazine. The terms of the deal were not disclosed. It was redesigned and launched as Lonny.com in November 2012. Irene Edwards joined as Executive Editor in March 2013.

In February 2015, the company announced that it was being acquired by the Axel Springer-owned Aufeminin Group.

In July 2015, the company launched Livingly.com, a lifestyle website for women.

In April 2018, Livingly Media's parent company, Aufeminin, was acquired by TF1(Télévision Française 1 S.A).

In May 2018, the company launching two new websites, Mabel + Moxie and It's Rosy.

In 2022, TF1 sold Livingly Media to Recurrent.

Other Platforms
All of Livingly's websites have mobile versions.  As of February 2017, Livingly had over 26.1 million monthly readers, of which 9.2 million accessed the sites via mobile devices, according to Quantcast.

Board Members
 Marie-Laure Sauty de Chalon, Aufeminin.com
 Christophe Decker, Aufeminin.com
 Erica Carter, CEO

Financing History
Series A, August 2007 – $6.8 Million
Investors:
 Menlo Ventures
 Draper Richards
 Sand Hill Angels 6, LLC

Series B, May 2012 – $8.9 Million
Investors:
 Menlo Ventures
 Great Oaks Venture Capital
 Draper Associates
 Comerica Bank
 Insikt Ventures
 Fenwick & West
 Sand Hill Angels 6, LLC

Offices
 101 Redwood Shores Pkwy Suite 150, Redwood City, CA 94065

References

External links

Published by Livingly Media
 It's Rosy
 Livingly
 Lon NY
 Mabel + Moxie
 Style Bistro
 Zimbio

Blog hosting services